Holditch was a ward in the Borough of Newcastle-under-Lyme, in the county of Staffordshire, England. It covered the suburbs of Broad Meadow, and Beasley. The population of the ward at the 2011 census was 4,694.

References

Wards of the Borough of Newcastle-under-Lyme